Helen Abbot Merrill (1864 – 1949) was an American mathematician, educator and textbook author.

Biography
Merrill was born on March 30, 1864, in Llewellyn Park, New Jersey; her father was a New Jersey insurance claims adjustor of colonial stock. She moved to Massachusetts as a child. She entered Wellesley College in 1882, intending to major in Greek and Latin, but switching to mathematics after one year, and graduated in 1886. In 1893 she began teaching at Wellesley while also studying and guest lecturing abroad. In 1903 she earned a PhD in mathematics at Yale under the direction of James Pierpont. In 1920 she was appointed vice-president of the Mathematical Association of America. Upon her retirement from Wellesley, she was given the title professor emerita.

At Wellesley, Merrill wrote two textbooks with Clara Eliza Smith, Selected Topics in Higher Algebra (Norwood, 1914) and A First Course in Higher Algebra (Macmillan, 1917).
She also wrote as a popularizer a book titled Mathematical Excursions in 1933.

Bibliography
 C. Henrion "Helen Abbot Merrill" in Women of Mathematics: A Bibliographic Sourcebook L. Grinstein, P. Campbell, ed.s New York: Greenwood Press (1987): 147 - 151

References

External links
 
  Biography on p. 415-418 of the Supplementary Material at AMS
:File:Woman s Who s who of America.pdf, 1914, p. 557 (= p. 546 in Pdf)

1864 births
1949 deaths
History of mathematics
Mathematicians from New Jersey
Wellesley College alumni
Wellesley College faculty
19th-century American mathematicians
20th-century American mathematicians
American women mathematicians
Mathematicians from Massachusetts
20th-century women mathematicians
20th-century American women
19th-century American women